Aulonemia patriae is a species of genus Aulonemia of bamboo. 
It is part of the grass family and endemic to Latin America.

References

patriae